Ahmad Mirza Jamil (21 February 192117 February 2014) was a Pakistani calligrapher best known for creation of Noori style of Nastaliq, which was first created as a digital typeface (font, Noori Nastaliq) in 1981.

Awards and recognition
 Tamgha-e-Imtiaz (Medal of Distinction) Award by the Government of Pakistan (1982) for his 'Invention of National Importance'.
 Doctor of Letters, Honoris Causa degree awarded by the University of Karachi in recognition of his achievement.

Books
He also wrote a book, 'Revolution in Urdu Composing' in which he describes the history of his achievement. This is a direct quote from his above book, "In future, Urdu authors will be able to compose their books like the authors of the languages of Roman script. Now, the day a manuscript is ready is the day the publication is ready for printing."

Death
Ahmed Mirza Jamil died on 17 February 2014 at age 92 in Karachi, Pakistan.

See also 
 InPage
 Nastaʿlīq script

References 

1921 births
2014 deaths
Pakistani calligraphers
Recipients of Tamgha-e-Imtiaz